Ib Thomsen (born 6 October 1961) is a Norwegian politician representing the Progress Party. He is a representative of Akershus in the Storting and was first elected in 2005.

Storting committees
2005–2009 member of the Municipality and Distribution committee.

External links

 Fremskrittspartiet - Biography

1961 births
Living people
Progress Party (Norway) politicians
Members of the Storting
21st-century Norwegian politicians